People who served as the mayor of the City of Auburn are:

References

Mayors Auburn
Auburn, Mayors
Mayors of Auburn